Arthur's Blues is a live album by saxophonist Art Pepper recorded in 1981 at the Maiden Voyage nightclub in Los Angeles and released on the Galaxy label in 1991. The album features tracks that were first released on The Complete Galaxy Recordings box set in 1989.

Reception

The AllMusic review by Stewart Mason noted "the quartet burns through a set of standards and originals that covers Pepper's full range of playing styles ... However, the highlight is the title track, Pepper's last great recording. A 15-minute groove that swings from soulful and funky blues to an intense climax, "Arthur's Blues" puts to rest the rumors that Art Pepper's chops had deserted him in his final years".

Track listing 
All compositions by Art Pepper except where noted.
 "Donna Lee" (Charlie Parker) - 9:36
 "Road Waltz" - 14:03
 "For Freddie" - 11:21
 "But Beautiful" (Jimmy Van Heusen, Johnny Burke) - 8:10 	
 "Arthur's Blues" - 14:43 		
Recorded at the Maiden Voyage, in Los Angeles CA on August 13, 1981 (track 1), August 14, 1981 (tracks 2 & 4) and August 15, 1981 (tracks 3 & 5)

Personnel 
Art Pepper - alto saxophone
George Cables - piano 
David Williams - bass 
Carl Burnett - drums

References 

Art Pepper live albums
1991 live albums
Galaxy Records live albums